Poppenwier is a village in Súdwest-Fryslân municipality in the province of Friesland, the Netherlands. It had a population of around 170 in January 2017.

History
The village was first mentioned in 1401 as Popengwere, and means "terp of the people of Poppa (person)". Poppenwier is a terp (artificial living hill) village from the early middle ages. The small terp is densely build up with a rectangular structure and a circle around the church. It was the furthest landinwards terp of Friesland.

In the late middle ages, the monastery Engwerd was located near the village. The Dutch Reformed church was built in 1860 as a replacement for its medieval predecessor.

Poppenwier was home to 229 people in 1840. Until the mid-19th century, the village was only accessible by water. Before 2011, the village was part of the Boarnsterhim municipality and before 1984 it belonged to Rauwerdhem municipality.

Gallery

References
 

Populated places in Friesland
Súdwest-Fryslân